Marijo Baković (born 11 April 1982) is a retired Croatian long jumper.

He finished seventh at the 1999 World Youth Championships and eleventh at the 2001 Summer Universiade. He also competed at the 2002 European Indoor Championships and the 2005 Summer Universiade without reaching the final.

Baković became Croatian long jump champion in 2003 and 2004, rivalling with Ivan Pucelj. He also became indoor champion in 2001 and 2004.

His personal best jump was 7.99 metres, achieved in July 2003 in Tarvisio.

Competition record

References

1982 births
Living people
Croatian male long jumpers
Athletes (track and field) at the 2005 Mediterranean Games
Mediterranean Games competitors for Croatia
20th-century Croatian people
21st-century Croatian people